Csaba Csatlós (born 29 March 1950) is a Hungarian former swimmer. He competed in four events at the 1968 Summer Olympics.

References

1950 births
Living people
Hungarian male swimmers
Olympic swimmers of Hungary
Swimmers at the 1968 Summer Olympics
Sportspeople from Eger